Enrique "Quique" González Casín (born 16 May 1990) is a Spanish professional footballer who plays for SD Eibar as a forward.

Club career
González was born in Valladolid, Castile and León. He finished his youth career with local club Real Valladolid, and made his senior debut with the reserves in the 2007–08 season, in the Segunda División B.

On 27 August 2010, González played his first match as a professional, coming on as a late substitute in a 3–0 home win against Villarreal CF B in the Segunda División. He finished the campaign with six appearances for the main squad, totalling 145 minutes.

On 2 September 2011, González joined third division side UD Logroñés on loan. After his return, he rejected a loan to CD Guijuelo and returned to the B team in the Tercera División, scoring 19 goals during 2012–13.

After being deemed surplus to requirements by new Valladolid manager Juan Ignacio Martínez, Quique terminated his contract on 21 August 2013. He signed for CD Guadalajara on the same day.

After netting a career-best 24 goals during his first and only season, González joined UD Almería of La Liga on 21 May 2014. He made his debut in the competition on 12 September, replacing Wellington Silva in the 64th minute of a 1–1 home draw against Córdoba CF.

González scored his first goal for the Andalusians on 5 December 2014, the third in a 4–3 away victory over Real Betis in the round of 32 of the Copa del Rey. On 30 January 2015, he was loaned to second-tier Racing de Santander until June.

After returning from loan, González was an undisputed starter for Almería, scoring 15 goals during the season. Highlights included a brace in a 3–1 win at SD Ponferradina, on 17 April 2016.

González scored a further 16 times during the 2016–17 campaign, with braces against Levante UD (2–2 home draw), AD Alcorcón (3–1 home win) and CD Mirandés (2–0, also home) – the latter strikes also managed to help his side avoid relegation. On 14 July 2017, he signed a five-year contract with CA Osasuna of the same league for a fee of € 1.5 million.

On 20 July 2018, González joined Deportivo de La Coruña still in the second division, for a fee of €1.7 million. He was their top scorer during the season, contributing 17 goals as the side missed out on promotion in the play-offs.

González agreed to a five-year deal with SD Eibar on 14 July 2019, for an undisclosed fee reported to be in the region of €3 million.

References

External links

1990 births
Living people
Spanish footballers
Footballers from Valladolid
Association football forwards
La Liga players
Segunda División players
Segunda División B players
Tercera División players
Real Valladolid Promesas players
Real Valladolid players
UD Logroñés players
CD Guadalajara (Spain) footballers
UD Almería players
Racing de Santander players
CA Osasuna players
Deportivo de La Coruña players
SD Eibar footballers